The women's double sculls rowing event at the 2011 Pan American Games will be held from October 15–17 at the Canoe & Rowing Course in Ciudad Guzman. The defending Pan American Games champion is Sarah Trowbridge & Margaret Matia of the United States.

Schedule
All times are Central Standard Time (UTC-6).

Results

Heat 1

Heat 2

Repechage

Final A

References

Women's rowing at the 2011 Pan American Games